DryvIQ is a software application that enables businesses to migrate on-site system files and associated data across storage and content management platforms as well as create synchronized hybrid storage systems.

History
Before it was DryvIQ, the software SkySync was released in 2013 by Ann Arbor, Michigan based company, Portal Architects, Inc. The company created SkySync, a back-end, administrative application designed to transfer content across storage platforms, after abandoning 18 months of development on a desktop application called SkyBrary in 2011.

Between 2014 and 2015, Portal Architects established partnerships with the following companies: Autodesk, Box, Dropbox, Egnyte, EMC, Google, Syncplicity, Huddle, IBM, Microsoft, OpenText, Oracle, Citrix ShareFile, Hightail and Internet2.

SkySync (currently DryvIQ) was named a "Cool Vendor in Content Management" by Gartner in 2015.

In 2022, SkySync changed its name to DryvIQ, which is now what the company is currently known as.

Overview

DryvIQ is a software application that syncs, migrates or backs up files including their associated properties, metadata, versions, user accounts and permissions across on-premises and Cloud-based storage platforms. The software deploys on a server, virtual machine or within Microsoft Azure, Amazon Web Services or other cloud computing services.

References

External links
Official website

Application software